The International Council on Clean Transportation (ICCT) is an independent nonprofit organization incorporated under Section 501(c)(3) of the US tax code. It provides technical and scientific analysis to environmental regulators. It is funded by the ClimateWorks Foundation,  the William and Flora Hewlett Foundation, the Energy Foundation, and the David and Lucile Packard Foundation.

Volkswagen emissions scandal 

The ICCT commissioned researchers at West Virginia University to test Volkswagen diesel car emissions in 2013. In May 2014, ICCT alerted the US EPA and the California Air Resources Board that the models displayed much higher levels of nitrogen oxide emissions than permitted by law. In September 2015, the EPA said Volkswagen could be liable for up to $18 billion in penalties for using software on almost 500,000 VW and Audi diesel cars sold between 2009 and 2015 that circumvented emissions regulations, unleashing a controversy that led to multiple regulatory probes worldwide.

In 2015 an ADAC study (ordered by ICCT) of 32 Euro6 cars showed that few complied with on-road emission limits. In 2016 ICCT measured 19 new cars and found that real emissions were 40% higher than they were approved with, primarily due to the lax methods of NEDC-testing.

See also 
 Volkswagen emissions violations
 John German
 International Committee of Clean Technologies
 CALSTART

References

External links
Official website

Environmental organizations based in the United States
International sustainability organizations
International transport organizations
Climate change organizations based in the United States
Organizations established in 1971
Transportation organizations based in the United States
Sustainable transport
1971 establishments in the United States